This is a list of Brazilian musicians, musicians born in Brazil or who have Brazilian citizenship or residency.

Classical music

 Alberto Nepomuceno (1864-1920), classical musician and composer
 Alexandre Levy (1864-1892), classical composer, pianist and conductor
 André da Silva Gomes (1752-1844), classical musician and sacred music composer
 Antonietta Rudge (1885-1974), classical pianist
 Brasílio Itiberê da Cunha (1846-1913), classical composer, lawyer and Brazilian diplomat
 Camargo Guarnieri (1907-1993), classical musician and composer
 Clarice Assad (1978-), classical composer
 Carlos Gomes (1836-1896), classical musician and composer
 César Guerra-Peixe (1914-1993), classical musician and composer
 Cláudio Santoro (1919-1989), classical musician and composer
 Elias Álvares Lobo (1834-1901), classical musician and composer
 Francisco Braga (1868-1945), classical composer, conductor and teacher
 Francisco Gomes da Rocha (1754-1808), classical composer
 Francisco Manuel da Silva (1795-1865), classical musician and composer
 Maria Alice de Mendonça, pianist and composer
 Francisco Mignone (1897-1986), classical composer and conductor
 Gilberto Mendes (1922-2016), classical composer
 Guiomar Novaes (1895-1979), classical pianist
 Hans-Joachim Koellreutter (1915-2005), composer, teacher and musicologist
 Heitor Villa-Lobos (1887-1959), classical musician and composer
 Henrique Oswald (1852-1931), composer and pianist
 Jorge Antunes (1942- ), classical musician and composer
 José Antônio Rezende de Almeida Prado (1943-2010), classical musician, pianist and composer
 José Carlos Amaral Vieira (1952- ), classical musician, pianist and composer
 José Joaquim Emerico Lobo de Mesquita (1746-1805), classical musician and composer
 José Maurício Nunes Garcia (1767-1830), classical musician and composer
 Leopoldo Miguez (1850-1902), classical musician and composer
 Luiz Hernane Barros De Carvalho, cellist
 Magda Tagliaferro (1893-1986), classical pianist and teacher
 Maria d'Apparecida (1926–2017), opera singer
 Marlos Nobre (1939- ), classical musician and composer
 Milton Nascimento (1942- ), jazz/folk guitarist, musician and composer
 Nelson Freire (1944- ), classical pianist.
 Osvaldo Lacerda (1927-2011), classical musician and composer
 Radamés Gnattali (1906-1988), classical composer, conductor, orchestrator and arranger
 Yara Bernette (1920-2002), classical pianist

Samba

 Adoniran Barbosa (1912–1982), singer and composer
 Alcione Nazaré (1947– ), singer
 Ary Barroso (1903–1964), singer and composer
 Beth Carvalho (1946–2019), singer
 Braguinha (1907–2006), singer and composer
 Carmen Miranda (1909–1955), singer, dancer, actress
 Cartola (1908–1980), singer and composer
 Clara Nunes (1943–1983), singer and composer
 Edson Ribeiro (1972– ), musician, footballer and composer
 Elizeth Cardoso (1920–1990), singer
 Elza Soares (1930–2022 ), singer
 Fernanda Porto (1965– ), singer and composer
 Jamelão (1913–2008), singer
 João Nogueira (1941–2000), singer and composer
 Jorge Aragão (1949– ), singer and composer
 Noel Rosa (1910–1937), singer and composer
 Paulinho da Viola (1942– ), singer and composer
 Pixinguinha (1897–1973), composer
 Seu Jorge (1970– ), singer and composer
 Zeca Pagodinho (1959– ), singer and composer

Choro

 Chiquinha Gonzaga (1847–1935), conductor and composer
 Ernesto Nazareth (1863–1934), composer
 Jacob do Bandolim (1918-1969), composer and musician
 Pixinguinha (1897-1973), composer and musician
 Waldir Azevedo (1923-1980), composer and musician

Christian and Gospel music

 Aline Barros, singer and composer
 Ana Nóbrega, singer and composer
 Ana Paula Valadão, singer and composer
 André Valadão, singer and composer
 Cassiane, singer and composer
 Cristina Mel, singer and composer
 Davi Sacer, singer and composer
 Diante do Trono, Christian music group
 Damares, singer and composer
 Deise Rosa, singer and composer
 Fernanda Brum, singer and composer
 Gabriela Rocha, singer and composer
 Hillsong Brasil, Christian music group
 Israel Salazar, singer and composer
 Juliano Son, singer and composer
 Livres para Adorar, Christian music group
 Lu Alone, singer and composer
 Ludmila Ferber, singer and composer
 Mariana Valadão, singer and composer
 Nívea Soares, singer and composer
 Oficina G3, Christian music group
 Rodolfo Abrantes, singer and composer
 Sarah Sheeva, singer and composer
 Soraya Moraes, singer and composer
 Trazendo a Arca, Christian music group

Bossa nova

 Antonio Carlos Jobim (1927-1994), composer and pianist
 Astrud Gilberto (born 1940), singer
 Baden Powell de Aquino (1937-2000), guitarist and composer
 Bebel Gilberto (born 1966), singer
 Celso Fonseca (born 1956), producer, singer, songwriter, guitarist
 Dolores Duran (1930-1959), singer and composer
 Carlos Lyra (born 1939), composer
 Ithamara Koorax (born 1965), singer
 João Gilberto (1931-2019), guitarist, composer and singer
 Márcio Faraco (born 1963), expatriate, singer, guitarist, composer
 Maysa (1936-1977), singer and composer
 Nara Leão (1942-1989), singer
 Paulinho Nogueira (1929-2003), classical musician, guitarist, and composer
 Roberto Menescal (born 1937), singer
 Sérgio Mendes (born 1941), pianist and arranger
 Toquinho (born 1946), guitarist, singer and composer
 Vinicius Cantuária (born 1951), singer, songwriter, guitarist
 Vinícius de Moraes (1913-1980), diplomat, poet, singer and composer
 Walter Wanderley (1932-1986), organist and arranger

Forró
 Elba Ramalho (born 1951), singer
 Falamansa, forró and xote group
 Gonzaguinha (1945-1991), singer and composer
 Luiz Gonzaga (1912-1989), singer and composer
 Sivuca (1930-2006), accordionist

Frevo
 Alceu Valença (born 1946), singer and composer
 Zé Ramalho (born 1949), singer and composer
 Elba Ramalho (born 1951), singer

Mangue beat
 Chico Science, singer and composer
 Fred 04, singer and composer
 Nação Zumbi, musical group
 Otto, singer and composer

Música popular brasileira, Tropicalismo

 Adriana Calcanhotto (1965–), singer and composer
 Alice Caymmi (1990–), singer and composer
 Ana Carolina (1974–), singer and composer
 Beto Guedes (1951–), singer, violinist and composer
 Caetano Veloso (1942–), singer and composer
 Cazuza (1958–1990), singer and composer
 Chico Buarque (1944–), singer and composer
 Chico César (1964–), singer and composer
 Damião Experiença (1935–2016), guitarist and harmonica player
 Djavan (1949–), singer and composer
 Dorival Caymmi (1914–2008), singer and composer
 Dudu Tucci (1955–), singer, composer and percussionist
 Ed Motta (1971–), funk/rock/electronic frontman, singer and composer

 Elis Regina (1945–1982), singer
 Elza Soares (1930–2022), singer and composer
 Fabio B. Mendonca (1963-), guitarist and composer
 Flavio Rodrigues (1979–), singer, musician, composer and guitarist
 Gal Costa (1945–2022), singer
 Gilberto Gil (1942–), singer and composer
 Gonzaguinha (1945–1991), singer and composer
 Heraldo do Monte (1935–), guitarist, member of Quarteto Novo (Airto Moreira, Hermeto Pascoal, Theo de Barros)
 Ivan Lins (1945–), singer and composer
 Ivete Sangalo (1972–), singer, songwriter and composer
 Jair Oliveira (1975–), singer and composer
 Jorge Ben Jor (1942–), singer and composer
 Jorge Mautner (1941–), writer and singer 
 Kátya Chamma (1961–), composer, singer, poet and writer
 Lenine (1959–), singer and composer
 Luciana Mello (1979–), singer and composer
 Luiz Melodia (1951–2017), singer and composer
 Marcelo Jeneci (1982–), singer and composer
 Marco Castillo (1963–), singer and composer
 Maria Bethânia (1946–), singer
 Maria Rita (1977–), singer
 Marina Elali (1982–), singer and composer
 Marina Lima (1955–), singer and composer
 Marisa Monte (1967–), singer and composer
 Maysa Matarazzo (1936–1977), singer
 Milton Nascimento (1942–), singer and composer
 Mônica da Silva, singer and composer
 Nelson Ned (1947–2014), singer
 Ney Matogrosso (1941–), singer
 Paula Lima (1970–), singer and composer
 Pepeu Gomes (1952–), composer
 Raul de Souza (1934–2021), trombonist
 Roberta Miranda (1956–), singer
 Roberto Carlos (1941–), singer and composer
 Silva (1969–), singer and composer
 Tim Maia (1942–1998), singer and composer
 Tom Zé (1936–), singer and composer
 Tulipa Ruiz (1978–), singer and composer
 Vanessa da Mata (1976–), singer and composer
 Zé Rodrix (1947–2009), guitarist, Som Imaginário, Sá, Rodrix & Guarabyra

Sertanejo music

 Alex Ferrari (1982–), "Universitário" country singer
 Almir Sater (1956–), country singer and actor
 Bruno e Marrone, country music duo
 Chitãozinho and Xororó, country music duo
 Daniel (1968–)(formerly João Paulo e Daniel, before João Paulo's death), romantic country singer and composer
 Edu Gueda (1998–), "Universitário" country singer
 Fernando e Sorocaba, "Universitário" country duo
 Gusttavo Lima (1990–), "Universitário" country singer
 Inezita Barroso (1925–2015), folk music singer and scholar
 Jorge e Mateus (born 1982, born 1986), "Universitário" country duo
 Leandro and Leonardo (1961–1998, born 1963), country music duo
 Luan Santana (1991–), "Universitário" country singer and composer
 Michel Teló (1981–), "Universitário" country singer
 Paula Fernandes (1984–), modern country singer
 Sá & Guarabyra, folk music duo
 Sérgio Reis (1940–), classic country singer and composer
 Tião Carreiro & Pardinho, folk music duo and scholar
 Tonico & Tinoco (1917–1994, 1920–2012), folk music duo and scholar
 Victor e Leo (born 1975, born 1976), country music duo
 Wanessa (1982–), modern country singer
 Zezé di Camargo & Luciano, country music duo

Jazz

 Dick Farney
 Luciana Souza
 Gustavo Assis-Brasil
 Victor Assis Brasil
 Paulinho da Costa
 Hélio Delmiro
 Egberto Gismonti
 Toninho Horta
 Romero Lubambo
 Cesar Camargo Mariano
 Airto Moreira
 Hermeto Pascoal
 Flora Purim
 Moacir Santos
 Sao Paulo Ska Jazz
 Naná Vasconcelos

Brazilian rock

 Andre Matos (1971–2019), singer, pianist, keyboardist, composer
 Andreas Kisser (1968–), guitarist for the thrash metal band Sepultura
 Arnaldo Antunes (1960–), singer, composer, poet
 Cadão Volpato (1956–), singer-songwriter, frontman of Fellini 
 Cássia Eller (1962–2001), singer 
 Cello Dias, Against All Will bassist
 Celso Blues Boy (1956–2012), singer-songwriter and guitarist 
 Chorão (1970–2013), Charlie Brown Jr. singer and frontman 
 Ciro Pessoa (1957–2020), singer-songwriter, former Titãs and Cabine C member
 Edu Falaschi (1972–), Angra singer 
 Erasmo Carlos (1941–2022), 70s rock singer and composer 
 Felipe Andreoli (1980–), Angra bassist 
 Fernanda Abreu (1961–), singer and composer
 Frank Jorge (1966–), bassist for Os Cascavelletes and Graforreia Xilarmônica
 Igor Cavalera (1970–), drummer for Cavalera Conspiracy
 Juli Manzi (1976–), singer and guitarist
 Jupiter Apple (1968–2015), Os Cascavelletes singer and frontman
 Herbert Vianna (1961–), Os Paralamas do Sucesso singer and frontman 
 Humberto Gessinger (1963–), Engenheiros do Hawaii singer and frontman 
 Kiko Loureiro (1972–), Angra guitarist
 Laufer, songwriter and guitarist
 Lobão (1957–), singer and composer 
 Lulu Santos (1953–), singer and composer 
 Marcelo Falcão (1973-), singer and composer for O Rappa
 Max Cavalera (1969–), singer, guitarist, Soulfly and Cavalera Conspiracy frontman 
 Nasi (1962–), Ira! singer and frontman
 Nei Van Soria (1969–), guitarist for Os Cascavelletes
 Os Mutantes, influential Brazilian psychedelic rock band linked with the Tropicália movement of the late 1960s
 Pitty (1977–), rock singer and composer
 Rafael Bittencourt (1971–), Angra guitarist
 Raul Seixas (1945–1989), rock singer and composer
 Renato Russo (1960–1996), Legião Urbana singer and frontman 
 Rita Lee (1947–), pop/rock singer and composer 
 Robertinho de Recife (1965–), guitarist and composer 
 Samuel Rosa (1966–), Skank singer and frontman 
 Secos e Molhados (1971–), influential psychedelic glam rock band 
 Thiago Modesto (1996–), Quimere singer and bassist 
 Tony Babalu (1953– ), musician, songwriter and record producer.
 Vange Leonel (1963–2014), singer-songwriter, vocalist of Nau 
 Vitor Assan (1996–), Quimere singer and guitarist

Experimental music
 André Abujamra (born 1965), composer, singer and multi-instrumentalist, member of Os Mulheres Negras and Karnak
 Arrigo Barnabé (born 1951), composer and singer
 Damião Experiença (1935-2016), composer, singer and multi-instrumentalist
 Denis Mandarino (born 1964), composer and singer
 Itamar Assumpção (1949-2003), composer and singer
 Jorge Antunes (born 1942), composer
 Lívio Tragtenberg (born 1961), composer and multi-instrumentalist
 Rogério Skylab (born 1958), composer and singer

Pop music

 Carrapicho, pop group
 Carmen Monarcha (born 1979), opera singer
 Balão Mágico, children's songs
 Gretchen (born 1959)
 Trem da Alegria, children's songs
 Xuxa (born 1963), singer
 Br'oZ, boyband
 Deborah Blando (born 1969), pop singer
 Felipe Dylon (born 1987), pop singer
 Kelly Key (born 1983), pop singer
 KLB, pop group/boyband
 Pitch Yarn of Matter, synthpop group (1993-1996)
 Luiza Possi (born 1984), MPB singer
 Sandy (born 1983), pop singer
 Sandy & Junior, pop singers/pop duo
 Lucinha Turnbull (born 1953), singer, guitarist
 Virginie Boutaud (born 1963), singer, vocalist of Metrô
 Rouge, pop girlband
 Lulu Santos (born 1953), pop singer
 Kasino, a band
 Anitta, pop singer
 Pabllo Vittar, drag queen and pop singer

Electronica
 Amon Tobin, producer and DJ
 Alok, producer and DJ
 INGEK, producer and DJ
 Chris Leão, DJ
 DJ Marky, DJ
 DJ Patife, DJ
 DJ Dolores, artist and DJ
 FTampa, artist, producer and DJ
 XRS Land, producer and DJ
 Gui Boratto, producer, composer
 DJ Marlboro, producer, composer, and DJ
 Drumagick, producer, Composer
 Vintage Culture, producer and DJ
 Bruno Furlan, producer and DJ

Brazilian hip hop
 MV Bill (born 1974), rapper
 Sonia Destre Lie, choreographer
 Emicida (born 1985), rapper
 Fausto Fawcett (born 1957), rapper and writer
 Marcelo D2 (born 1967), rapper
 Mr. Thug (born 1990), singer
 Negra Li (born 1979), singer
 Gabriel o Pensador, rapper
 Pollo, rappers group
 Racionais MC's, rappers group
 Bonde da Stronda, rappers group
 Sabotage (1973-2003), rapper

Axé music
 Cláudia Leitte, axé singer
 Margareth Menezes, axé singer
 Daniela Mercury
 Ivete Sangalo, axé/pop singer

Funk carioca
 Tati Quebra Barraco, singer
 DJ Marlboro, MC and DJ
 MC Sapão, singer-songwriter
 Mr. Catra, singer-songwriter
 Pocah, singer-songwriter
 Tati Zaqui, singer-songwriter

Soundtrack 

 Marcos Valle, musician and producer

References

musicians
Musicians
Brazilian